Mount Ellsworth is located in the Lewis Range, Glacier National Park in the U.S. state of Montana. Mount Ellsworth is in the southeastern section of Glacier National Park and can be seen from Two Medicine Lake and surrounding areas. Mount Ellsworth is named, "for "Billy" Ellsworth, an oldtimer who packed for the U. S. Geological Survey."

See also
 Mountains and mountain ranges of Glacier National Park (U.S.)

References

Mountains of Glacier County, Montana
Mountains of Glacier National Park (U.S.)
Lewis Range